Ulvik is a village in the municipality of Ulvik which is located in Vestland county, Norway. The village sits at the end of the Ulvikafjorden, a side arm off of the main Hardangerfjord.

The centre of the village is called "Brakanes" and it is located at the mouth of the river Tysso.  This is the downtown part of the village and it includes most of the commercial areas including a cinema as well as Ulvik Church, the only church in the municipality. Brakanes School is a primary and lower secondary school (and the only school in Ulvik). The school has about 150 students that attend there.

History
The village centre of Ulvik was burned by the Germans in April 1940, as retaliation to having been hindered by Norwegian resistance fighters who were landing in Ulvik.  In total, 56 houses were burned.  The following day, the population, mainly farmers, were chased away from their homes, not being able to return for several months.  The village was rebuilt after the war, with the hotel reopening in 1952.

References

Ulvik
Villages in Vestland